The I Lyga, LFF I Lyga, Pirma Lyga, is the second tier of professional Lithuanian football championship.

Format

Organized by the Lithuanian Football Federation (LFF), I Lyga is contested by 16 teams, with the top team gaining promotion to A Lyga and replaced by the lowest-placed team in top division. The second-placed team qualifies to a promotion play-off with A Lyga's second to last team. Bottom 2 clubs are relegated to the II Lyga, and 3rd last team plays a play-off with the 3rd placed team in II Lyga. The final list of participants often does not correlate to the final results of the previous season, as the participation is finalized through the Lithuanian Football Federation league licensing process. Number of participants also fluctuate due to frequent club collapses.

History

There were 15 teams competing in the 2017 season. At the end of this season, three teams withdrew from the league.

In 2018, there were 14 teams that started the championship. However, FK Koralas Klaipėda withdrew in the mid-season. After the end of the season, two more teams have withdrawn from participation in the next season.

The 2019 season saw 16 teams starting the championship. In June FC Stumbras ran into financial difficulties, its license was withdrawn from the A Lyga, along with Stumbras B license in the I Lyga. In July Stumbras B was removed from the league, with all results annulled as the team played less than half of all season games. At the end of the season I Lyga side FC Kupiškis was found to be involved in match-fixing, and subsequently fined and demoted to II Lyga.

Although the 2019 I Lyga winners FC Džiugas Telšiai won promotion to A lyga, the club failed to meet 2020 A Lyga licensing criteria, and had their promotion was forfeited. Only FK Banga Gargždai had advanced to A Lyga.

The 2020 season was affected by the COVID-19 pandemic, and was shortened to 1.5 rounds. 14 teams participated in the tournament, with four teams offered promotion to A Lyga. 

2021 season ran in full despite some COVID-19 threats. As four teams advanced to the A Lyga, and one club withdrew, five teams joined from the II Lyga. Previous season winner FK Jonava were denied A Lyga license because of allegations of match-fixing. The league consisted of 14 teams, with an expectation to expand the league to 16 the next season.

2022 season featured stable 16 team tournament and a fierce fight for the promotion to A lyga. Eventually, DFK Dainava secured the promotion, returning to A lyga after one season.

Current Season
2023 season features 16 teams: eleven clubs and five B teams. 
 FK Jonava, FK Neptūnas, FK Nevėžis, Be1 NFA, Marijampolė City, FK Babrungas, BFA, FK Ekranas, FK Minija, FK Garliava, FK Transinvest
 Žalgiris B, Panevėžys B, FA Šiauliai B, Riteriai B, Kauno Žalgiris B.

Past Seasons

References

External links 
 
 Lithuanian football history and statistics by Almantas Lauzadis
  League321.com – Lithuanian football league tables, records & statistics database.

 
2
Lith
Professional sports leagues in Lithuania